Burlesk King is the second film in the gay-themed trilogy of Mel Chionglo and Ricky Lee about the lives of macho dancers, men who work as strippers in Manila's gay bars. The first is Sibak: Midnight Dancers; the third is Twilight Dancers. Other films exploring the same theme are Lino Brocka's Macho Dancer (1988) and Brillante Mendoza's Masahista (The Masseur, 2005).

Plot
Harry went to Manila with his friend James to exact vengeance on his abusive father who used to pimp him and killed his mother. He ended up working as a Macho dancer in a gay club and became involved with a gay writer and a hooker. When he set out to look for his father to avenge his mother's death, he found him dying of AIDS in a shack in squatter's area and told him that his mother was alive after all. He looked for his mother and got reunited with her who taught him to forgive his father. His father eventually dies.

Cast
Rodel Velayo as Harry
Leonardo Litton as James
Elizabeth Oropesa as Betty
Raymond Bagatsing as Mario
Cherry Pie Picache as Aileen
Gino Ilustre as Michael
Nini Jacinto as Brenda
Joonee Gamboa as Miong
Joel Lamangan as Odette
Tonio Ortigas as Leo
Ross Rival
Frannie Zamora
Joseph Buncalan
Arthur Cassanova
Joey Galvez
Joseph Pe
Sofia Valdez
Aila Marie

External links 
 

1999 films
Philippine LGBT-related films
Tagalog-language films
1999 drama films
LGBT-related drama films
1999 LGBT-related films
Gay-related films
Films directed by Mel Chionglo